East Coolgardie was an electoral district of the Legislative Assembly in the Australian state of Western Australia from 1897 to 1901.

In 1898, the district included Kalgoorlie, Boulder, and the lucrative East Coolgardie goldfield. It existed for one term of parliament, and was represented in that time by Charles Moran (the former member for Yilgarn). Moran would later become the member for West Perth.

Members for East Coolgardie

References 

East Coolgardie
City of Kalgoorlie–Boulder